Lolazor (formerly Қайрағоч Kayraghoch or Kayragach; also known as "Western Qal'acha") is a small exclave of Tajikistan, which is just across the international border inside Kyrgyzstan. Situated 7 km south of Mehrobod (formerly Proletarsk, Tajikistan) and 14 km north of Sulukta (Kyrgyzstan), it is completely surrounded by the Leilek District of Batken Region, Kyrgyzstan. It is near the railway station of Stantsiya Kayragach, on the line from Proletarsk to Sulukta. It is part of the jamoat Gulkhona in Jabbor Rasulov District.

See also 
Sarvan, the Tajikistan exclave in Uzbekistan
Vorukh, the other Tajikistan exclave in Kyrgyzstan
Shohimardon, an Uzbekistan exclave in Kyrgyzstan
Sokh, an Uzbekistan exclave in Kyrgyzstan
List of enclaves and exclaves

References

External links 
 Satellite map at Maplandia.com
 Satellite map at Geonames.org

Enclaves and exclaves
Populated places in Sughd Region